Mamalan (also Romanized as Māmālān; also known as Māhmalānlū, Makhmalanlu, Narcham, Parcham, and Purcham) is a village in Gilvan Rural District, in the Central District of Tarom County, Zanjan Province, Iran. At the 2006 census, its population was 429, in 116 families.

References 

Populated places in Tarom County